Josiah Smith (February 26, 1738 – April 4, 1803) was a United States representative from Massachusetts. Born in Pembroke in the Province of Massachusetts Bay, to Reverend Thomas Smith and Judith Miller Smith.   Smith graduated from Harvard College in 1774, studied law, was admitted to the bar and practiced.

Service in Congress
Smith was elected as a Democratic-Republican to the Seventh Congress, serving from March 4, 1801 to March 3, 1803. He was not a candidate for renomination in 1802.

Death and burial
On his way home from Washington, Smith contracted smallpox in New York, he died in Pembroke.  Smith was interred in Center Cemetery, Pembroke, Massachusetts.

References

External links

 

1738 births
1803 deaths
Harvard College alumni
Members of the Massachusetts House of Representatives
People from Pembroke, Massachusetts
Massachusetts state senators
Deaths from smallpox
Democratic-Republican Party members of the United States House of Representatives from Massachusetts
Burials in Massachusetts